Mandi may refer to:

Places
 Mandı, Azerbaijan
 Mendi, Oromia, Ethiopia as an alternative transliteration

India
 Mandi, Jammu and Kashmir, a town on the Mandi River in the Poonch district of Jammu and Kashmir
 Mandi, Himachal Pradesh, a city in Himachal Pradesh
 Mandi State, former princely state
 Mandi (Lok Sabha constituency)
 Mandi (Vidhan Sabha constituency)
 Mandi district, a district in Himachal Pradesh
 Mandi, Jalandhar, a village in Punjab
 Mandi, Uttar Pradesh, a village in Uttar Pradesh
 Mandi Dabwali, a city in Sirsa district, Haryana
 Mandi Gobindgarh, a town in Punjab
 Mandi, Phagi, village in Jaipur district, Rajasthan

Pakistan
 Mandi, Mirpur, a village in Azad Kashmir
 Mandi Bahauddin, a town in Punjab
 Mandi Bahauddin District, a district in Punjab
 Heera Mandi, a district of Lahore

People
 Aïssa Mandi (born 1991), Algerian footballer
 Armando Sosa Peña (born 1989), known as Mandi, Spanish football midfielder
 Gyula Mándi (1899–1969), Hungarian Olympic footballer and manager
 Imre Mándi (1916–1943), Hungarian boxer
 Nazanin Mandi (born 1986), American model, actress, and singer
 Mandi Lampi (1988–2008), Finnish actress and singer
 Mandi Perkins, Canadian rock musician
 Mandi Schwartz (1988–2011), Canadian ice hockey player

Other uses
 Mandi (bath), a method of bathing in Indonesia and Malaysia
 Mandi (film), a 1983 Hindi film by Shyam Benegal
 Mandi (food), a popular meal in Arabia
 Mandi (legendary creature), a short-lived race from medieval bestiaries
 Mandi (Mandaeism), a place of worship for followers of Mandaeism
 Mandi tribe, an indigenous people of Western Australia
 Sabzi Mandi (disambiguation), a wholesale food market in South Asia

See also
 Mande (disambiguation)
 Mandy (disambiguation)